

Events

Pre-1600
AD 25 – Luoyang is declared capital of the Eastern Han dynasty by Emperor Guangwu of Han.
 176 – Emperor Marcus Aurelius grants his son Commodus the rank of "Imperator" and makes him Supreme Commander of the Roman legions.
 395 – Rufinus, praetorian prefect of the East, is murdered by Gothic mercenaries under Gainas.
 511 – King Clovis I dies at Lutetia and is buried in the Abbey of St Genevieve.
 602 – Byzantine Emperor Maurice is forced to watch as the usurper Phocas executes his five sons before Maurice is beheaded himself.
1095 – Pope Urban II declares the First Crusade at the Council of Clermont.

1601–1900
1727 – The foundation stone to the Jerusalem Church in Berlin is laid.
1809 – The Berners Street hoax is perpetrated by Theodore Hook in the City of Westminster, London.
1815 – Adoption of Constitution of the Kingdom of Poland.
1830 – Saint Catherine Labouré experiences a Marian apparition.
1835 – James Pratt and John Smith are hanged in London; they are the last two to be executed for sodomy in England.
1839 – In Boston, Massachusetts, the American Statistical Association is founded.
1856 – The Coup of 1856 leads to Luxembourg's unilateral adoption of a new, reactionary constitution.
1863 – American Civil War: Confederate cavalry leader John Hunt Morgan and several of his men escape the Ohio Penitentiary and return safely to the South.
  1863   – American Civil War: Battle of Mine Run: Union forces under General George Meade take up positions against troops led by Confederate General Robert E. Lee.
1868 – American Indian Wars: Battle of Washita River: United States Army Lieutenant Colonel George Armstrong Custer leads an attack on Cheyenne living on reservation land.
1895 – At the Swedish–Norwegian Club in Paris, Alfred Nobel signs his last will and testament, setting aside his estate to establish the Nobel Prize after he dies.
1896 – Also sprach Zarathustra by Richard Strauss is first performed.

1901–present
1901 – The U.S. Army War College is established.
1912 – Spain declares a protectorate over the north shore of Morocco.
1917 – P. E. Svinhufvud becomes the chairman of his first senate, technically the first Prime Minister of Finland.
1918 – The Makhnovshchina is established.
1924 – In New York City, the first Macy's Thanksgiving Day Parade is held.
1940 – In Romania, the ruling Iron Guard fascist party assassinates over 60 of arrested King Carol II of Romania's aides and other political dissidents.
  1940   – World War II: At the Battle of Cape Spartivento, the Royal Navy engages the Regia Marina in the Mediterranean Sea.
1942 – World War II: At Toulon, the French navy scuttles its ships and submarines to keep them out of Nazi hands.
1944 – World War II: RAF Fauld explosion: An explosion at a Royal Air Force ammunition dump in Staffordshire kills seventy people.
1945 – CARE (then the Cooperative for American Remittances to Europe) is founded to send CARE Packages of food relief to Europe after World War II.
1954 – Alger Hiss is released from prison after serving 44 months for perjury.
1965 – Vietnam War: The Pentagon tells U.S. President Lyndon B. Johnson that if planned operations are to succeed, the number of American troops in Vietnam has to be increased from 120,000 to 400,000.
1968 – Penny Ann Early becomes the first woman to play major professional basketball for the Kentucky Colonels in an ABA game against the Los Angeles Stars.
1971 – The Soviet space program's Mars 2 orbiter releases a descent module. It malfunctions and crashes, but it is the first man-made object to reach the surface of Mars.
1973 – Twenty-fifth Amendment: The United States Senate votes 92–3 to confirm Gerald Ford as Vice President of the United States. (On December 6, the House will confirm him 387–35).
1975 – The Provisional IRA assassinates Ross McWhirter, after a press conference in which McWhirter had announced a reward for the capture of those responsible for multiple bombings and shootings across England.
1978 – In San Francisco, city mayor George Moscone and openly gay city supervisor Harvey Milk are assassinated by former supervisor Dan White.
  1978   – The Kurdistan Workers' Party (PKK) is founded in the Turkish village of Fis.
1983 – Avianca Flight 011: A Boeing 747 crashes near Madrid's Barajas Airport, killing 181.
1984 – Under the Brussels Agreement signed between the governments of the United Kingdom and Spain, the former agrees to enter into discussions with Spain over Gibraltar, including sovereignty.
1989 – Avianca Flight 203: A Boeing 727 explodes in mid-air over Colombia, killing all 107 people on board and three people on the ground. The Medellín Cartel will claim responsibility for the attack.
1992 – For the second time in a year, military forces try to overthrow president Carlos Andrés Pérez in Venezuela.
1997 – Twenty-five people are killed in the second Souhane massacre in Algeria.
1999 – The centre-left Labour Party takes control of the New Zealand government with leader Helen Clark becoming the first elected female Prime Minister in New Zealand's history.
2001 – A hydrogen atmosphere is discovered on the extrasolar planet Osiris by the Hubble Space Telescope, the first atmosphere detected on an extrasolar planet.
2004 – Pope John Paul II returns the relics of Saint John Chrysostom to the Eastern Orthodox Church.
2006 – The House of Commons of Canada approves a motion introduced by Prime Minister Stephen Harper recognizing the Québécois as a nation within Canada.
2008 – XL Airways Germany Flight 888T: An Airbus A320 performing a flight test crashes near the French commune of Canet-en-Roussillon, killing all seven people on board.
2009 – Nevsky Express bombing: A bomb explodes on the Nevsky Express train between Moscow and Saint Petersburg, derailing it and causing 28 deaths and 96 injuries.
2015 – An active shooter inside a Planned Parenthood facility in Colorado Springs, Colorado, shoots at least four police officers. One officer later dies. Two civilians are also killed, and six injured. The shooter later surrendered.
2020 – Iran's top nuclear scientist, Mohsen Fakhrizadeh, is assassinated near Tehran.
  2020   – Days after the announcement of its discovery, the Utah monolith is removed by recreationists.

Births

Pre-1600
111 – Antinous, Greek favourite of Hadrian (d. 130)
1127 – Emperor Xiaozong of Song (d. 1194)
1380 – King Ferdinand I of Aragon (d. 1416)
1422 – Gaston IV, Count of Foix, French nobleman (d. 1472)
1548 – Jacopo Mazzoni, Italian philosopher (d. 1598)
1558 – Mingyi Swa, Crown Prince of Burma (d. 1593)
1576 – Shimazu Tadatsune, Japanese daimyō (d. 1638)
1582 – Pierre Dupuy, French historian and scholar (d. 1651)

1601–1900
1630 – Sigismund Francis, Archduke of Austria (d. 1665)
1635 – Françoise d'Aubigné, Marquise de Maintenon, second wife of Louis XIV of France (d. 1719)
1640 – Barbara Palmer, 1st Duchess of Cleveland (d. 1709)
1701 – Anders Celsius, Swedish astronomer, physicist, and mathematician (d. 1744)
1710 – Robert Lowth, English bishop and academic (d. 1787)
1746 – Robert R. Livingston, American lawyer and politician, 1st United States Secretary for Foreign Affairs (d. 1813)
  1746   – Increase Sumner, American lawyer, jurist, and politician, 5th Governor of Massachusetts (d. 1799)
1754 – Georg Forster, German-Polish ethnologist and journalist (d. 1794)
1759 – Franz Krommer, Czech violinist and composer (d. 1831)
1779 – Aimé, duc de Clermont-Tonnerre, French general and politician, French Minister of Defence (d. 1865)
1804 – Julius Benedict, German-English conductor and composer (d. 1885)
1809 – Fanny Kemble, English actress, playwright, and poet (d. 1893)
1814 – Charles-François-Frédéric, marquis de Montholon-Sémonville, French politician and diplomat, French ambassador to the United States (d. 1886)
1820 – Rachel Brooks Gleason, fourth woman to earn a medical degree in the United States (d. 1905)
1823 – James Service, Scottish-Australian politician, 12th Premier of Victoria (d. 1899)
1833 – Princess Mary Adelaide of Cambridge (d. 1897)
1843 – Cornelius Vanderbilt II, American businessman (d. 1899)
1845 – Frederic Crowninshield, American artist and author (d. 1918)
1853 – Frank Dicksee, English painter and illustrator (d. 1928)
1857 – Charles Scott Sherrington, English physiologist, bacteriologist, and pathologist, Nobel Prize laureate (d. 1952)
1859 – William Bliss Baker, American painter (d. 1886) 
1865 – Janez Evangelist Krek, Slovene priest, journalist, and politician (d. 1917)
1867 – Charles Koechlin, French composer and educator (d. 1950)
1870 – Juho Kusti Paasikivi, Finnish academic and politician, 7th President of Finland (d. 1956)
1871 – Giovanni Giorgi, Italian physicist and engineer (d. 1950)
1874 – Charles A. Beard, American historian, author, and educator, co-founded The New School (d. 1948)
  1874   – Chaim Weizmann, Belarusian-Israeli chemist and politician, 1st President of Israel (d. 1952)
1875 – Julius Lenhart, Austrian gymnast (d. 1962)
1877 – Katharine Anthony, American biographer (d. 1965)
1878 – Jatindramohan Bagchi, Indian poet and critic (d. 1948)
  1878   – Charles Dvorak, American pole vaulter and coach (d. 1969)
1885 – Daniel Mendaille, French actor (d. 1963) 
  1885   – Liviu Rebreanu, Romanian author and playwright (d. 1944)
1886 – Tsuguharu Foujita,  Japanese–French painter and printmaker  (d. 1968)
1887 – Masaharu Homma, Japanese general (d. 1946)
1888 – Ganesh Vasudev Mavalankar, Indian activist and politician, 1st Speaker of the Lok Sabha (d. 1956)
1894 – Konosuke Matsushita, Japanese businessman, founded Panasonic (d. 1989)
  1894   – Katherine Milhous, American author and illustrator (d. 1977)
  1894   – Amphilochius of Pochayiv, Ukrainian monk and saint (d. 1971)
1898 – Fredric Warburg, English author and publisher (d. 1981)
1900 – Jovette Bernier, Canadian journalist, author, and radio show host (d. 1981)

1901–present
1901 – Ted Husing, American sportscaster (d. 1962)
1903 – Lars Onsager, Norwegian-American chemist and physicist, Nobel Prize laureate (d. 1976)
1905 – Astrid Allwyn, American actress (d. 1978)
1907 – Harivansh Rai Bachchan, Indian poet and author (d. 2003)
  1907   – L. Sprague de Camp, American historian and author (d. 2000)
1909 – James Agee, American novelist, screenwriter, and critic (d. 1955)
  1909   – Anatoly Maltsev, Russian mathematician and theorist (d. 1967)
1911 – Fe del Mundo, Filipino pediatrician and educator (d. 2011)
  1911   – David Merrick, American director and producer (d. 2000)
1912 – Connie Sawyer, American actress (d. 2018)
1916 – Chick Hearn, American sportscaster and actor (d. 2002)
1917 – Buffalo Bob Smith, American actor and television host (d. 1998)
1918 – Stephen Elliott, American actor (d. 2005)
1920 – Abe Lenstra, Dutch footballer (d. 1985)
  1920   – Buster Merryfield, English actor (d. 1999)
  1920   – Cal Worthington, Automobile dealer and television personality (d. 2013)
1921 – Dora Dougherty Strother, American pilot and academic (d. 2013)
  1921   – Alexander Dubček, Slovak soldier and politician (d. 1992)
1922 – Hall Bartlett, American director, producer, and screenwriter (d. 1993)
  1922   – Nicholas Magallanes, American principal dancer and charter member of the New York City Ballet (d. 1977)
1923 – J. Ernest Wilkins Jr., American nuclear scientist, mechanical engineer and mathematician (d. 2011)
1925 – John Maddox, Welsh chemist, physicist, and journalist (d. 2009)
  1925   – Marshall Thompson, American actor, director, and screenwriter (d. 1992)
  1925   – Derroll Adams, American folk singer-songwriter and musician (d. 2000) 
  1925   – Ernie Wise, English actor, comedian, singer, and screenwriter (d. 1999)
1926 – Chae Myung-shin, South Korean general (d. 2013)
1927 – Carlos José Castilho, Brazilian footballer and manager (d. 1987)
  1927   – William E. Simon, American soldier and politician, 63rd United States Secretary of the Treasury (d. 2000)
1928 – Alekos Alexandrakis, Greek actor and director (d. 2005)
  1928   – Josh Kirby, English painter and illustrator (d. 2001)
1929 – Alan Simpson, English screenwriter and producer (d. 2017)
1930 – Joe DeNardo, American meteorologist (d. 2018)
  1930   – Dick Poole, Australian rugby league player and coach
  1930   – Rex Shelley, Singaporean engineer and author (d. 2009)
1932 – Benigno Aquino Jr., Filipino journalist and politician (d. 1983)
1933 – Jacques Godbout, Canadian journalist, author, director, and screenwriter
  1933   – Gordon S. Wood, American historian and academic
1934 – Ammo Baba, Iraqi footballer and manager (d. 2009)
  1934   – Al Jackson, Jr., American drummer, songwriter, and producer (d. 1975)
  1934   – Gilbert Strang, American mathematician and academic
1935 – Les Blank, American director and producer (d. 2013)
  1935   – Daniel Charles, French musicologist and philosopher (d. 2008)
  1935   – Willie Pastrano, American boxer (d. 1997)
1936 – Gail Sheehy, American journalist and author (d. 2020)
1938 – John Ashworth, English biologist and academic
  1938   – Apolo Nsibambi, Ugandan academic and politician, Prime Minister of Uganda (d. 2019)
1939 – Dave Giusti, American baseball player and manager
  1939   – Laurent-Désiré Kabila, Congolese politician, President of the Democratic Republic of the Congo (d. 2001)
1940 – Bruce Lee, American-Chinese actor, martial artist, and screenwriter (d. 1973)
1941 – Aimé Jacquet, French footballer, coach, and manager
  1941   – Eddie Rabbitt, American singer-songwriter and guitarist (d. 1998)
  1941   – Louis van Dijk, Dutch pianist (d. 2020)
1942 – Henry Carr, American football player and sprinter (d. 2015)
  1942   – Marilyn Hacker, American poet and critic
  1942   – Jimi Hendrix, American singer-songwriter, guitarist, and producer (d. 1970)
1943 – Nicole Brossard, Canadian author and poet
  1943   – Jil Sander, German fashion designer
1944 – Mickey Leland, American activist and politician (d. 1989)
1945 – James Avery, American actor (d. 2013)
  1945   – Phil Bloom, Dutch model and actress
  1945   – Randy Brecker, American trumpeter and flugelhornist
  1945   – Alain de Cadenet, English race car driver
  1945   – Benigno Fitial, Mariana Islander businessman and politician, 7th Governor of the Northern Mariana Islands
  1945   – Simon Townsend, Australian journalist and television host
1946 – Richard Codey, American politician, 53rd Governor of New Jersey  
  1946   – Ismaïl Omar Guelleh, Ethiopian-Djiboutian lawyer and politician, President of Djibouti
1947 – Don Adams, American basketball player (d. 2013)
  1947   – Neil Rosenshein, American tenor and actor
1949 – Masanori Sekiya, Japanese race car driver
1950 – Gavyn Davies, English journalist and businessman
1951 – Kathryn Bigelow, American director, producer, and screenwriter
  1951   – Vera Fischer, Brazilian actress, winner from Miss Brasil 1969 contest
  1951   – Gunnar Graps, Estonian singer and guitarist (d. 2004)
1952 – Sheila Copps, Canadian journalist and politician, 6th Deputy Prime Minister of Canada
  1952   – Bappi Lahiri, Indian singer-songwriter and producer
  1952   – Jim Wetherbee, American captain, engineer, and astronaut
1953 – Curtis Armstrong, American actor, singer, and producer
  1953   – Steve Bannon, American media executive and political figure 
  1953   – Boris Grebenshchikov, Russian singer-songwriter and guitarist
  1953   – Tarmo Kõuts, Estonian admiral and politician
  1953   – Lyle Mays, American keyboardist and composer (d. 2020)
  1953   – Richard Stone, American composer (d. 2001)
1954 – Arthur Smith, English comedian, actor, and screenwriter
1955 – Pierre Mondou, Canadian ice hockey player
  1955   – Bill Nye, American engineer, educator, and television host
1956 – William Fichtner, American actor
  1956   – John McCarthy, English journalist and author
  1956   – Nazrin Shah of Perak, Sultan of Perak
1957 – Kenny Acheson, Northern Irish race car driver
  1957   – Frank Boeijen, Dutch singer-songwriter and guitarist
  1957   – Caroline Kennedy, American lawyer and diplomat, 29th United States Ambassador to Japan, daughter of President John F. Kennedy
  1957   – Callie Khouri, American director, producer, and screenwriter
  1957   – Michael A. Stackpole, American game designer and author
  1957   – Edda Heiðrún Backman, Icelandic actress, singer, director and artist (d. 2016)
1958 – Tetsuya Komuro, Japanese singer-songwriter, and producer
  1958   – Mike Scioscia, American baseball player and manager
1959 – Charlie Burchill, Scottish guitarist and songwriter 
  1959   – Viktoria Mullova, Russian violinist
1960 – Kevin Henkes, American author and illustrator
  1960   – Ken O'Brien, American football player and coach
  1960   – Tim Pawlenty, American lawyer and politician, 39th Governor of Minnesota
  1960   – Yulia Tymoshenko, Ukrainian economist and politician, 10th Prime Minister of Ukraine
  1960   – Gianni Vernetti, Italian lawyer and politician
1961 – Samantha Bond, English actress
  1961   – Steve Oedekerk, American actor, director, and screenwriter
1962 – Charlie Benante, American drummer and songwriter 
  1962   – Mike Bordin, American drummer 
  1962   – Davey Boy Smith, English-Canadian wrestler (d. 2002)
1963 – Fisher Stevens, American actor, director, and producer
1964 – Robin Givens, American actress
  1964   – Roberto Mancini, Italian footballer and manager
  1964   – Hisayuki Sasaki, Japanese golfer (d. 2013)
1965 – Danielle Ammaccapane, American golfer
1966 – Andy Merrill, American television writer, producer and voice actor
1968 – Michael Vartan, French-American actor
  1968   – Al Barrow, English bass guitarist
1969 – Ruth George, English politician
  1969   – Damian Hinds, English politician
  1969   – Myles Kennedy, American singer-songwriter 
1970 – Kelly Loeffler, American politician and businesswoman
1971 – Kirk Acevedo, American actor
  1971   – Larry Allen, American football player
  1971   – Iván Rodríguez, Puerto Rican-American baseball player
  1971   – Nick Van Exel, American basketball player and coach
1972 – Shane Salerno, American screenwriter and producer
1973 – Sharlto Copley, South African actor
  1973   – Samantha Harris, American model and television host
  1973   – Evan Karagias, American wrestler and actor
  1973   – Jin Katagiri, Japanese comedian, actor, sculptor, and potter
  1973   – Twista, American rapper and producer
1974 – Wendy Houvenaghel, Northern Irish racing cyclist 
  1974   – Alec Newman, Scottish actor
1975 – Bad Azz, American rapper (d. 2019)
  1975   – Martín Gramática, Argentinian-American football player
  1975   – Rain Vessenberg, Estonian footballer
1976 – Jean Grae, South African-American rapper and producer
  1976   – Chad Kilger, Canadian ice hockey player and firefighter
  1976   – Jaleel White, American actor and screenwriter
1977 – Willie Bloomquist, American baseball player
  1977   – Bendor Grosvenor, British art historian
1978 – Eszter Molnár, Hungarian tennis player
  1978   – Jimmy Rollins, American baseball player
  1978   – Mike Skinner, English rapper and producer
  1978   – Radek Štěpánek, Czech tennis player
1979 – Ricky Carmichael, American motocross racer
  1979   – Hilary Hahn, American violinist
  1979   – Teemu Tainio, Finnish footballer
1980 – Jackie Greene, American singer-songwriter and guitarist 
  1980   – Veronika Portsmuth, Estonian singer and conductor
  1980   – Michael Yardy, English cricketer
1981 – Bruno Alves, Portuguese footballer 
  1981   – Ryan Jimmo, Canadian mixed martial artist (d. 2016)
  1981   – Matthew Taylor, English footballer
1982 – David Bellion, French footballer
  1982   – Aleksandr Kerzhakov, Russian footballer
  1982   – Tommy Robinson, English activist, co-founded the English Defence League
1983 – Professor Green, English rapper
  1983   – Donta Smith, American-Venezuelan basketball player
1984 – Izumi Kitta, Japanese voice actress and singer
  1984   – Domata Peko, American football player
  1984   – Leslie Dewan, American entrepreneur
1985 – Park Soo-jin, South Korean singer 
  1985   – Alison Pill, Canadian actress
  1985   – Thilo Versick, German footballer
  1986   – Suresh Kumar Raina, Indian cricketer
  1986   – Steven Silva, American-Filipino footballer
  1986   – Xavi Torres, Spanish footballer
  1986   – Oritsé Williams, English singer-songwriter, producer, and dancer 
1989 – Michael Floyd, American football player
  1989   – Freddie Sears, English footballer
1990 – Josh Dubovie, English singer
1992 – Ala Boratyn, Polish singer-songwriter
  1992   – Park Chanyeol, South Korean rapper, singer, songwriter, actor and model
1995 – Suliasi Vunivalu, Fijian rugby league player
1996 – Mike Williams, Dutch DJ and record producer
  1996   – Andy Truong, Australian fashion designer
 2001 – Zoe Colletti, American actress

Deaths

Pre-1600
8 BC – Horace, Roman soldier and poet (b. 65 BC)
 395 – Rufinus, Roman politician (b. 335)
 450 – Galla Placidia, Roman Empress (b. 392)
 511 – Clovis I, king of the Franks
 602 – Maurice, Byzantine emperor (b. 539)
 639 – Acarius, bishop of Doornik and Noyon 
1198 – Constance, Queen of Sicily (b. 1154)
1252 – Blanche of Castile (b. 1188)
1346 – Saint Gregory of Sinai (b. c. 1260)
1382 – Philip van Artevelde, Flemish patriot (b. 1340)
1474 – Guillaume Du Fay, French composer and music theorist (b. 1397)
1570 – Jacopo Sansovino, Italian sculptor and architect (b. 1486)
1592 – Nakagawa Hidemasa, Japanese commander (b. 1568)

1601–1900
1620 – Francis, Duke of Pomerania-Stettin, Bishop of Cammin (b. 1577)
1632 – John Eliot, English politician (b. 1592)
1703 – Henry Winstanley, English painter and engineer (b. 1644)
1754 – Abraham de Moivre, French-English mathematician and theorist (b. 1667)
1811 – Andrew Meikle, Scottish engineer, designed the threshing machine (b. 1719)
1819 – Gustavus Conyngham, Irish-born American merchant sea captain, an officer in the Continental Navy and a privateer.  
1830 – André Parmentier, Belgian-American architect (b. 1780)
1852 – Ada Lovelace, English mathematician and computer scientist (b. 1815)
1875 – Richard Christopher Carrington, English astronomer and educator (b. 1826)
1881 – Theobald Boehm, German flute player and composer (b. 1794)
1884 – Fanny Elssler, Austrian ballerina (b. 1810)
1890 – Mahatma Phule, Indian Activist (b. 1827)
1895 – Alexandre Dumas, fils, French novelist and playwright (b. 1824)
1899 – Constant Fornerod, Swiss academic and politician, 10th President of the Swiss Council of States (b. 1819)

1901–present
1901 – Clement Studebaker, American businessman, co-founded Studebaker (b. 1831)
1908 – Jean Albert Gaudry, French geologist and palaeontologist (b. 1827)
1916 – Emile Verhaeren, Belgian poet and playwright (b. 1855)
1919 – Manuel Espinosa Batista, Panamanian pharmacist and politician (b. 1857)
1920 – Alexius Meinong, Ukrainian-Austrian philosopher and author (b. 1853)
1921 – Douglas Cameron, Canadian contractor and politician, 8th Lieutenant Governor of Manitoba (b. 1854)
  1921   – Mary Grant Roberts, Australian zoo owner (b. 1841)
1930 – Simon Kahquados, Potawatomi political activist (b. 1851)
1931 – Lya De Putti, Slovak-American actress (b. 1899)
1934 – Baby Face Nelson, American criminal (b. 1908)
1936 – Basil Zaharoff, Greek-French businessman and philanthropist (b. 1849)
1940 – Nicolae Iorga, Romanian historian and politician, 34th Prime Minister of Romania (b. 1871)
1943 – Ivo Lola Ribar, Croatian soldier and politician (b. 1916)
1944 – Leonid Mandelstam, Russian physicist and academic (b. 1879)
1953 – Eugene O'Neill, American playwright, Nobel Prize laureate (b. 1888)
1955 – Arthur Honegger, French-Swiss composer and academic (b. 1892)
1958 – Georgi Damyanov, Bulgarian politician, Head of State of Bulgaria (b. 1892)
  1958   – Artur Rodziński, Polish-American conductor (b. 1892)
1960 – Frederick Fane, Irish-English cricketer (b. 1875)
  1960   – Dirk Jan de Geer, Dutch lawyer and politician, Prime Minister of the Netherlands (b. 1870)
1962 – August Lass, Estonian footballer (b. 1903)
1967 – Léon M'ba, Gabonese politician, 1st President of Gabon (b. 1902)
1969 – May Gibbs, English Australian children's author, illustrator, and cartoonist, (b. 1877)
1970 – Helene Madison, American swimmer and nurse (b. 1913)
1973 – Frank Christian, American trumpet player (b. 1887)
1975 – Alberto Massimino, Italian automotive engineer (b. 1895)
  1975   – Ross McWhirter, English author and activist, co-founded the Guinness Book of Records (b. 1925)
1977 – Mart Laga, Estonian basketball player (b. 1936)
1978 – Harvey Milk, American lieutenant and politician (b. 1930)
  1978   – George Moscone, American lawyer and politician, 37th Mayor of San Francisco (b. 1929)
1980 – F. Burrall Hoffman, American architect, designed the Villa Vizcaya (b. 1882)
1981 – Lotte Lenya, Austrian singer and actress (b. 1898)
1985 – Rendra Karno, Indonesian actor (b. 1920)
1986 – Steve Tracy, American actor (b, 1952)
1988 – John Carradine, American actor (b. 1906)
  1988   – Jan Hein Donner, Dutch chess player and author (b. 1927)
1989 – Carlos Arias Navarro, Spanish politician, Prime Minister of Spain (b. 1908)
1990 – David White, American actor (b. 1916)
  1990   – Basilis C. Xanthopoulos, Greek physicist and academic (b. 1951)
1992 – Ivan Generalić, Croatian painter (b. 1914)
1994 – Fernando Lopes-Graça, Portuguese composer and conductor (b. 1906)
1997 – Buck Leonard, American baseball player and educator (b. 1907)
1998 – Barbara Acklin, American singer-songwriter (b. 1943)
  1998   – Gloria Fuertes, Spanish poet and author of children's literature (b. 1917)
1999 – Yasuhiro Kojima, Japanese-American wrestler and trainer (b. 1937)
  1999   – Alain Peyrefitte, French scholar and politician, French Minister of Justice (b. 1925)
  1999   – Elizabeth Gray Vining, American author and librarian (b. 1902)
2000 – Malcolm Bradbury, English author and academic (b. 1932)
  2000   – Uno Prii, Estonian-Canadian architect (b. 1924)
  2000   – Len Shackleton, English footballer and journalist (b. 1922)
2002 – Billie Bird, American actress (b. 1908)
  2002   – Shivmangal Singh Suman, Indian poet and academic (b. 1915)
2005 – Jocelyn Brando, American actress (b. 1919)
  2005   – Joe Jones, American singer-songwriter (b. 1926)
2006 – Don Butterfield, American tuba player (b. 1923)
  2006   – Bebe Moore Campbell, American author and educator (b. 1950)
  2006   – Casey Coleman, American sportscaster (b. 1951)
2007 – Bernie Banton, Australian activist (b. 1946)
  2007   – Robert Cade, American physician and academic, co-invented Gatorade (b. 1927)
  2007   – Sean Taylor, American football player (b. 1983)
  2007   – Bill Willis, American football player and coach (b. 1921)
2008 – V. P. Singh, Indian lawyer and politician, 7th Prime Minister of India (b. 1931)
2009 – Al Alberts, American singer-songwriter (b. 1922)
2010 – Irvin Kershner, American actor, director, and producer (b. 1923)
2011 – Len Fulford, English photographer and director (b. 1928)
  2011   – Ken Russell, English actor, director, producer, and screenwriter (b. 1927)
  2011   – Gary Speed, Welsh footballer and manager (b. 1969)
2012 – Mickey Baker, American guitarist (b. 1925)
  2012   – Ab Fafié, Dutch footballer and manager (b. 1941)
  2012   – Érik Izraelewicz, French journalist and author (b. 1954)
  2012   – Marvin Miller, American businessman and union leader (b. 1917)
  2012   – Jack Wishna, American photographer and businessman, co-founded Rockcityclub (b. 1958)
2013 – Lewis Collins, English-American actor (b. 1946)
  2013   – Herbert F. DeSimone, American lawyer and politician, Attorney General of Rhode Island (b. 1929)
  2013   – Volker Roemheld, German physiologist and biologist (b. 1941)
  2013   – Nílton Santos, Brazilian footballer (b. 1925)
  2013   – Manuel F. Segura, Filipino colonel (b. 1919)
2014 – Wanda Błeńska, Polish physician and missionary (b. 1911)
  2014   – Phillip Hughes, Australian cricketer (b. 1988)
  2014   – P. D. James, English author (b. 1920)
  2014   – Jack Kyle, Irish rugby player and humanitarian (b. 1926)
  2014   – Fernance B. Perry, Portuguese-American businessman and philanthropist (b. 1922)
2015 – Mark Behr, Tanzanian-South African author and academic (b. 1963)
  2015   – Maurice Strong, Canadian businessman and diplomat (b. 1929)
  2015   – Garrett Swasey, American figure skater and coach (b. 1971)
  2015   – Philippe Washer, Belgian tennis player and golfer (b. 1924)
2016 – Ioannis Grivas, Greek statesman (b. 1923)
2020 – Mohsen Fakhrizadeh, Iranian nuclear scientist (b. 1958) 
2021 – Apetor, Norwegian YouTuber (b. 1964)

Holidays and observances
Christian feast day:
Acarius of Tournai
Barlaam and Josaphat
Bilihildis
Congar of Congresbury
Facundus and Primitivus
Humilis of Bisignano
James Intercisus
Leonard of Port Maurice
Our Lady of the Miraculous Medal (Roman Catholic)
Secundinus
Siffredus of Carpentras
Vergilius of Salzburg
Clovis I
November 27 (Eastern Orthodox liturgics)
Lancashire Day (United Kingdom)
Maaveerar Day (Tamil Eelam, Sri Lanka)
Naval Infantry Day (Russia)
Teacher's Day (Spain)

References

External links

 
 
 

Days of the year
November